Michel Nédélec (7 March 1940 – 3 October 2009) was a French cyclist. He competed in the team pursuit at the 1960 Summer Olympics.

References

External links
 

1940 births
2009 deaths
French male cyclists
Olympic cyclists of France
Cyclists at the 1960 Summer Olympics
Sportspeople from Finistère
French track cyclists